The 1948–49 Illinois Fighting Illini men’s basketball team represented the University of Illinois.

Regular season
The 1948-49 squad, led by Dike Eddleman, Bill Erickson, and Walter Osterkorn, was Illinois’ first 20-game winner since 1908, finishing 21-4. Illinois beat Yale, 71-67, to advance to a national semifinal showdown with Kentucky at Madison Square Garden in New York City. The Illini fell to the Wildcats, 76-47, forcing Illinois to defeat Oregon State, 57-53, in Seattle for third place.

Roster

Source

Schedule
												
Source																
												

|-
!colspan=12 style="background:#DF4E38; color:white;"| Non-Conference regular season

						

|-
!colspan=9 style="background:#DF4E38; color:#FFFFFF;"|Big Ten regular season

|-
!colspan=9 style="text-align: center; background:#DF4E38"|NCAA tournament

|-

NCAA basketball tournament
Eastern
 Illinois 71, Yale 67
Final Four
 Kentucky 76, Illinois 47
Third-place game
 Illinois 57, Oregon State 53

Rankings

Player stats

Awards and honors
 Dwight Eddleman
Converse 1st team All-American (1949)
Associated Press 2nd team All-American (1949)
United Press International 2nd team All-American (1949)
Chicago Tribune Silver Basketball award (1949)
Big Ten Player of the Year (1949)
Fighting Illini All-Century team (2005)
Team Most Valuable Player 
Bill Erickson
Consensus 2nd team All-American (1949)
Helms 1st team All-American (1949)
Collier's Weekly 1st team All-American (1949)
National Association of Basketball Coaches 1st team All-American (1949)
United Press International 3rd team All-American (1949)
Sporting News 3rd team All-American (1949)
Converse Honorable Mention All-American (1949)

Team players drafted into the NBA

Rankings

References

Illinois Fighting Illini
Illinois Fighting Illini men's basketball seasons
NCAA Division I men's basketball tournament Final Four seasons
Illinois
1948 in sports in Illinois
1949 in sports in Illinois